Bannon is an Irish surname. The following are people bearing that surname:

Ann Bannon (born 1932), American author of lesbian pulp fiction novels
Bernard Bannon (1874−1938), English cricketer
Brian Bannon (born 1930), Australian politician from New South Wales
Bruce Bannon (born 1951), American professional football player
Chad Bannon (born 1970), American television and film actor
Christine Bannon-Rodrigues (born 1966), American martial artist and actress
David "Race" Bannon (born 1963), American fraudster who posed as a former Interpol agent
"Des" Bannon (1923–2000), Australian rugby player 
Dorothy Bannon (1885–1940), British nurse 
Eamonn Bannon (born 1958), Scottish football player
Henry T. Bannon (1867–1950), U.S. Congressman from Ohio (1905–1909), historian, and attorney
J.G. Bannon (1874–1937), American college football coach
Jack Bannon (1940–2017), American television actor
Jacob Bannon (born 1976), American musician and artist
James Bannon (disambiguation)
Jim Bannon (1911–1984), American radio and film actor
Jimmy Bannon (1871–1948), American baseball player
John Bannon (1829–1913), Irish Catholic priest
John Bannon (1943–2015), Australian politician and academic
Kevin Bannon (born 1957), American basketball coach
Paul Bannon (fl. 2006–2013), Gaelic footballer (with about 6 seasons of league play)
Paul (Anthony) Bannon (1956–2016), Irish player of association football, 1975 to 1995  (with less than a season of league play of Gaelic football) 
Philip M. Bannon (1872–1940), American Marine Corps Brevet Medal recipient
Rylan Bannon (born 1996), American baseball player
Séamus Bannon (born 1927), Irish retired sportsman 
Shane Bannon (born 1989), American football player
Steve Bannon (born 1953), American media executive, political strategist, and former investment banker

Fictional characters
 Captain Bannon, a character in the video game World in Conflict
 Roger T. "Race" Bannon, a fictional character featured in the TV series, Jonny Quest

See also
O'Bannon (disambiguation)
Bannan (disambiguation)
Bannen (disambiguation)